The 1928 Ethiopian coup d'état was an attempt by supporters of Empress Zewditu to rid her of the heir apparent and Crown Prince, Ras Tafari Makonnen.  With Tafari gone, Zewditu would be the sole ruler of the Ethiopian Empire (Mangista Ityop'p'ya).

Events
In September 1928, in Addis Ababa, a group of palace reactionaries made a final bid to rid the Empress of Tafari.  The group included some of Zewditu's courtiers.  The attempted coup d'état was tragic in its origins and comic in its end.

When confronted by Tafari and a company of troops, the ringleaders of the coup took refuge on the palace grounds in Menelik's mausoleum.  Tafari and his men surrounded them only to be surrounded themselves by the personal guard of Zewditu.  More of Tafari's khaki clad soldiers arrived and surrounded Zewditu's guard.  Tafari's soldiers were equipped with newly imported rifles, machine guns, small cannon, and an obsolete but menacing tank.  The tank, a Fiat 3000, had been a gift to Empress Zewditu from the Duke of Abruzzi of Italy during a visit some years earlier.

In the end, the superiority of arms of the forces supporting Tafari decided the outcome in his favor.

See also
 List of coups d'état and coup attempts
 Balcha Safo
 Gugsa Wale's rebellion

Notes
Footnotes

Citations

References

External links
 

1928 in Ethiopia
Attempted coups in Ethiopia
Conflicts in 1928
September 1928 events